Olding, originally Olthingthang or Olthing Thang, is a village in the Dras River vallley in the Kharmang District of Baltistan, Pakistan. It is close to the India-Pakistan border (LOC), and lies on the traditional trade route between Baltistan and Ladakh via Kargil.

Geography 
Olthingthang is in the valley of the Dras River (also called Shingo River or Suru River), shortly before its confluence with the Indus River near Marol. The Dras valley is quite narrow there, and the village is actually located on the slopes of a spur, about 800 to 1,000 ft above the river. It was described as a big village in 1912, and often listed as a halting place on the route from Kargil to Skardu. It is 13 miles from Gangam, the first village in Baltistan to the north of the Line of Control.

People 
The village is predominantly inhabited by Tibetic peoples such as Baltis and Purigpas, Balti and Purgi are the main languages and Urdu serving as lingua franca. The dominant faith practiced by the people is Islam.

Economy 
The village is known for many varieties of fruit such as apricot, apple, grapes, mulberry, cherry and peach etc. Peoples of the village sell the fruits and earn thousands of rupees. Varieties of apricots include margholum, halmand, khochuli, sitachuli, khositar and Situnchuli.

Maps

See also 
 Skardu
 Kargil
 Kashmir

Notes

References

Bibliography 
 
 
 

Baltistan
Populated places in Kharmang District
Populated places in Pakistan